Utetheisa sumatrana is a moth of the family Erebidae first described by Walter Rothschild in 1910. It is found on north-eastern Sumatra.

References

Moths described in 1910
sumatrana
Fauna of Sumatra